
Gmina Białe Błota is a rural gmina (administrative district) in Bydgoszcz County, Kuyavian-Pomeranian Voivodeship, in north-central Poland.

Villages
Gmina Białe Błota contains the villages and settlements of Białe Błota, Ciele, Dębinek, Drzewce, Kruszyn Krajeński, Lipniki, Lisi Ogon, Łochowice, Łochowo, Murowaniec, Prądki, Przyłęki, Trzciniec and Zielonka.

Neighbouring gminas
Gmina Białe Błota is bordered by the town of Bydgoszcz and by the gminas of Łabiszyn, Nakło nad Notecią, Nowa Wieś Wielka, Sicienko and Szubin.

References
Polish official population figures 2006

Biale Blota
Bydgoszcz County